The 2014–15 Manhattan Jaspers basketball team represented Manhattan College during the 2014–15 NCAA Division I men's basketball season. The Jaspers, led by fourth year head coach Steve Masiello, played their home games at Draddy Gymnasium and were members of the Metro Atlantic Athletic Conference. They finished the season 19–14, 13–7 in MAAC play to finish in a tie for third place. They defeated Marist, Saint Peter's and Iona to win the MAAC tournament to receive an automatic bid to the NCAA tournament where they lost in the First Four to Hampton.

Roster

Schedule

|-
!colspan=9 style=";"| Exhibition

|-
!colspan=9 style=";"| Regular season

|-
!colspan=9 style=";"| MAAC tournament

|-
!colspan=9 style=";"| NCAA tournament

References

Manhattan Jaspers basketball seasons
Manhattan
Manhattan
Manhattan Jaspers men's basketball
Manhattan Jaspers men's basketball